Rita Borralho (born 21 March 1954) is a Portuguese long-distance runner. She competed in the women's marathon at the 1984 Summer Olympics.

References

1954 births
Living people
Athletes (track and field) at the 1984 Summer Olympics
Portuguese female long-distance runners
Portuguese female marathon runners
Olympic athletes of Portugal
Place of birth missing (living people)